1st meridian may refer to:

1st meridian east, a line of longitude east of the Greenwich Meridian
1st meridian west, a line of longitude west of the Greenwich Meridian
First principal meridian in Ohio and Indiana, United States, 84°48'50" west of Greenwich
Principal meridian of the Dominion Land Survey in Canada, 97°27′28.41″ west of Greenwich
Counter Revolutionary Warfare Unit aka First Meridian Squadron, a former special forces unit in the Fijian military

See also
Meridian 1, a Russian communications satellite